Colin Walker may refer to:

Colin Walker (footballer, born 1929), English former footballer
Colin Walker (cellist) (born 1949), English cellist
Colin Walker, lead drummer of Albannach
Colin Walker (footballer, born 1958), English-born New Zealand former footballer and manager
Colin Walker (runner) (born 1962), English steeplechaser
Colin Walker (bowls) (born 1975), Scottish bowls international